Curtis Scott Dunkel is an American psychologist and professor in the Department of Psychology at Western Illinois University, where he was granted tenure in August 2012. His research has covered topics such as death anxiety and the general factor of personality.

References

External links
Faculty page

Living people
American social psychologists
Personality psychologists
Western Illinois University faculty
University of Nebraska–Lincoln alumni
Place of birth missing (living people)
Year of birth missing (living people)